Franklin County is a county located in the U.S. state of North Carolina. As of the 2020 census, the population was 68,573. Its county seat is Louisburg.

Franklin County is included in the Raleigh, NC Metropolitan Statistical Area, which is also included in the Raleigh-Durham-Chapel Hill, NC Combined Statistical Area, which had a 2019 estimated population of 2,079,687.

History
The county was formed in 1779 from the southern half of Bute County.  It is named for Benjamin Franklin. It is a part of the Research Triangle.

County formation timeline
 1664 Albemarle County formed (original, extinct)
 1668 Albemarle County subdivided into Carteret, Berkeley, & Shaftesbury Precincts
 1681 Shaftesbury Precinct renamed Chowan Precinct
 1722 Bertie Precinct formed from Chowan Precinct
 1739 Bertie Precinct becomes Bertie County
 1741 Edgecombe County formed from Bertie County
 1746 Granville County formed from Edgecombe County
 1754 Creation of Bertie Precinct, Edgecombe County, & Granville County repealed by King George II, in Privy Council
 1756 Bertie, Edgecombe, & Granville re-created
 1764 Bute County (extinct) formed from Granville County
 1779 Franklin County formed from Bute County (extinct)
 1787 Franklin County gains land from Wake County
 1875 Franklin County gains land from Granville County
 1881 Franklin County loses land to help form Vance County

School desegregation
The integration of Franklin County Schools in 1965–1968 was marked by a federal lawsuit and some violence against African-American residents. The North Carolina Humanities Council funded the Tar River Center for History and Culture at Louisburg College to prepare "An Oral History of School Desegregation in Franklin County, North Carolina."

County song
The "Franklin County Song" was selected in a 1929 contest by the county historical association as the song most suitable for public occasions. The words were written by Fred U. Wolfe, an agriculture teacher at Gold Sand. Sung to the tune "Maryland, My Maryland" ("O Christmas Tree"), the song was incorporated in the Bicentennial programs of 1979. At the evening convocation of January 29, Mrs. Beth Norris announced to the audience that Wolfe (retired and residing in North, South Carolina) was aware his song was part of the program that night.
With loyalty we sing thy praise,
Glory to thy honored name!
Our voices loud in tribute raise,
Making truth thy pow'r proclaim.
Thy past is marked with vict'ry bold;
Thy deeds today can ne'er be told,
And heroes brave shall e'er uphold
Franklin's name forevermore.

We love thy rich and fruitful soil,
Wood, and stream, and thriving town.
We love the gift of daily toil,
Making men of true renown.
Thy church and school shall ever stand
To drive the darkness from our land—
A true and loyal, valiant band,
Sons of Franklin evermore.

A shrine of promise, pow'r and truth,
Lasting righteousness and peace,
A land of hope for toiling youth,
Yielding songs that never cease.
Let ev'ry son and daughter stay
The hand of vice that brings decay.
When duty's voice we shall obey,
Franklin's name shall live for aye.

Geography

State and local protected area 
 V.E. and Lydia H. Owens Recreational Park at Bull Creek

Major water bodies 
 Buffalo Creek
 Camping Creek
 Crooked Creek
 Fishing Creek
 Lake Royale
 Little River (Neuse River tributary)
 Sandy Creek
 Shocco Creek
 Tar River

Adjacent counties 
 Warren County - northeast
 Vance County - north
 Granville County - northwest
 Wake County - southwest
 Nash County - east

Major highways

  (Concurrency with US 64)

Major infrastructure 
 Triangle North Executive Airport

Demographics

2020 census

As of the 2020 United States census, there were 68,573 people, 26,720 households, and 20,443 families residing in the county.

2010 census
As of the census of 2010, there were 60,619 people, 23,023 households, and 16,317 families residing in the county. The population density was 123 people per square mile (47/km2). The racial makeup of the county was 66.0% White, 26.7% Black or African American, 0.5% Native American, 0.5% Asian, 0.0% Pacific Islander, 4.4% from other races, and 1.8% from two or more races.  7.9% of the population were Hispanic or Latino of any race.

There were 23,023 households, out of which 30.2% had children under the age of 18 living with them, 52.3% were married couples living together, 13.4% had a female householder with no husband present, and 29.1% were non-families. 24.2% of all households were made up of individuals, and 8.8% had someone living alone who was 65 years of age or older.  The average household size was 2.56 and the average family size was 3.04.

In the county, the population was spread out, with 27.3% under the age of 20, 5.5% from 20 to 24, 26.2% from 25 to 44, 28.5% from 45 to 64, and 12.6% who were 65 years of age or older.  The median age was 39.1 years. For every 100 females there were 99.1 males.  For every 100 females age 18 and over, there were 97.0 males.

The median income for a household in the county was $41,696, and the median income for a family was $51,353.  Males had a median income of $41,025 versus $34,562 for females.  The per capita income for the county was $21,399.  About 12.3% of families and 16.1% of the population were below the poverty line, including 20.6% of those under age 18 and 13.7% of those age 65 or over.

Housing
There were 26,577 housing units at an average density of 54 per square mile (21/km2). 13.4% of housing units were vacant.

There were 23,023 occupied housing units in the town. 17,029 were owner-occupied units (74.0%), while 5,994 were renter-occupied (26.0%). The homeowner vacancy rate was 2.4% of total units. The rental unit vacancy rate was 7.6%.

Law and government
Franklin County is governed by an appointed county manager and a seven-member Board of Commissioners who are elected in staggered four-year terms.  Five are chosen by district and the other two at-large.  Additional county officials who are elected include Sheriff, Register of Deeds, Board of Education and Clerk of Superior Court.

Franklin County is patrolled by the Franklin County Sheriff's Office located in Louisburg. The current sheriff is Kent Winstead, who was elected in 2014. Bunn, Franklinton, Louisburg and Youngsville have their own municipal police departments, regulated by the respective town governments. The community of Lake Royale near Bunn also has its own police department. Franklin County also is covered by Troop C, District IV of the North Carolina Highway Patrol, located in Henderson, North Carolina.
 County Manager: Kim Denton
 County Assistant Manager: William Doerfer
 Commissioner [District 1]: Kelli London
 Commissioner [District 2]: Cedric K. Jones Sr.
 Commissioner [District 3]: James Mark Speed
 Commissioner [District 4]: David Bunn
 Commissioner [District 5]: Michael Schriver
 Commissioner [At-Large]: Harry L. Foy Jr.
 Commissioner [At-Large]: Danny Pearce
 Clerk to the Board: Kristen G. King
 Sheriff: Kent Winstead
 Clerk of Superior Court: Shelley Dickerson 
 Register of Deeds: Brandi Brinson
 Finance Director: Jamie Holtzman
 Public Utilities Director: Chris Doherty
 Emergency Management Director: Nicholas Thorpe
 Public Information Officer: James Hicks

Franklin County is a member of the Kerr-Tar Regional Council of Governments.

Politics 

Franklin County, from 1912 until 1964, was a typical Solid South entity, with Democratic presidential candidates nearly always receiving 80 percent or more of the popular vote. George Wallace garnered the majority of the vote in 1968 as a third-party candidate. Beginning in 1972, the county swung in the opposite direction, with the Republican candidate earning the majority of the vote in most elections since.

Economy 
The county's economy and population is growing due to its proximity to growth in Wake County.

Education
Franklin County Schools operates 16 schools throughout the county, ranging from pre-kindergarten through twelfth grade. They include four high schools, four middle schools and eight elementary schools.

Franklin County is home to the two-year Methodist-affiliated Louisburg College and to a satellite campus of Vance-Granville Community College.

Youngsville Academy, a college-preparatory, tuition-free Charter School, opened in July 2015.Wake Prep a Charter School with an enrollment of 750 opened in 2022.

Communities

Towns
 Bunn
 Franklinton
 Louisburg (county seat)
 Wake Forest
 Youngsville

Census-designated places
 Centerville
 Lake Royale

Unincorporated communities

 Alert
 Epsom
 Five Points
 Gold Sand
 Gupton
 Halls Crossroads
 Harris Crossroads
 Hickory Rock
 Ingleside
 Katesville
 Kearney
 Justice
 Laurel Mill
 Mapleville
 Margaret
 Mitchiners Crossroads
 Moulton
 Needmore
 New Hope
 Oswego
 Pearces
 Pilot
 Pine Ridge
 Pocomoke
 Raynor
 Riley
 Rocky Ford
 Royal
 Schloss
 Seven Paths
 Stallings Crossroads
 Sutton
 White Level
 Wilders Corner
 Wood

Townships

 Cedar Rock
 Cypress Creek
 Dunn
 Franklinton
 Gold Sand
 Hayesville
 Louisburg
 Sandy Creek
 Youngsville

See also
 List of counties in North Carolina
 National Register of Historic Places listings in Franklin County, North Carolina
 List of future Interstate Highways
 Haliwa-Saponi, state-recognized tribe that resides in the county

References

External links

 
 
 Greater Franklin County Chamber of Commerce
 Franklin County Sheriff's Office
 Franklin County Schools
 Franklin County News Online newspaper
 Wake Weekly newspaper

 
Research Triangle
1779 establishments in North Carolina
Populated places established in 1779